The KSM Show is a weekly entertainment programme in Ghana hosted by Kwaku Sintim-Misa.

References

Ghanaian television shows